Michael Haydn's Symphony No. 29 in D minor, Opus 1 No. 3, Perger 20, Sherman 29, MH 393, written in Salzburg in 1784, is the only minor key symphony he wrote. It is the first of four D minor symphonies attributed to Joseph Haydn.

Movements  

Scored for two oboes, two bassoons, two horns, two trumpets, timpani, and strings. The bassoons are almost always in unison with the cellos. The Jenő Vecsey edition of 1960 does not show a timpani part, but this is easily enough reconstructed from the trumpet part by tuning the timpani to A and D a fourth apart and using the same rhythms and pitch classes as the trumpets. In three movements:

Allegro brillante
Andantino in B-flat major
Rondeau, #Presto scherzante

The first movement, Allegro brillante, is a sonata form that begins with a theme which is basically a D minor scale going up, followed by i and V arpeggiations. The second subject theme uses syncopations and has a dance-like character. The horns are in F, trumpets in D.

The second movement, Andantino in B-flat major, gives the ornamented version of the theme first, in the strings. The trumpets in thirds, reinforced by the other winds, then give the unadorned version of the theme. Horns are B-flat basso and trumpets are in B-flat.

The third movement is a rondeau, Presto scherzante. Horns are in F, trumpets in D. The A theme could be seen as a metamorphosis of the first subject of the first movement. The final statement of the A theme in D minor is almost the same as the first except the horns are absent while they change crooks to D. After a fermata on a V7 chord, the A theme is given in D major to close the symphony.

Notes

References
 Charles H. Sherman and T. Donley Thomas, Johann Michael Haydn (1737–1806), a chronological thematic catalogue of his works. Stuyvesant, New York: Pendragon Press (1993).
 C. Sherman, "Johann Michael Haydn" in The Symphony: Salzburg, Part 2. London: Garland Publishing (1982): lxviii.

External links
 The Classical Archives has the first movement in a MIDI format file at the H page. There is no figured bass realization and the tempo is almost half of the Raţiu recording (so almost twice the duration). Timpani are not included.

1784 compositions
Compositions in D minor
Symphony 29